This article contains a list of the Southern Rhodesian facilities forming part of Joint Air Training Scheme which was a major programme for training South African Air Force, Royal Air Force and Allied air crews during World War II. However, RAF Training units would still be based in this country until a decade after the war had finished

A war-time Elementary Flying Training School (EFTS) gave a recruit 50 hours of basic aviation instruction on a simple trainer like the Tiger Moth.  Pilots who showed promise went on to training at a Service Flying Training School (SFTS).  The Service Flying Training School provided advanced training for pilots, including fighter and multi-engined aircraft.  Other trainees went on to different specialties, such as wireless, navigation or bombing and air gunnery.

During WW II
These are the units that formed the Rhodesia Air Training Group.

Training aircraft

 Airspeed Oxford
 North American Harvard
 Tiger Moth
 Avro Anson
 Fairey Battle
 Fairchild Cornell

Glossary

 ANS — Air Navigation School
 ARU — Aircraft Repair Unit
 BGTS — Bombing and Gunnery Training School
 CFS — Central Flying School
 EFTS — Elementary Flying Training School
 FIS — Flying Instructors School
 SFTS — Service Flying Training School
 SRAF — Southern Rhodesia Air Force

After World War II

Training aircraft

 North American Harvard
 Tiger Moth
 Avro Anson
 DeHavilland Chipmunk

Glossary

 ANS — Air Navigation School
 FTS — Flying Training School
 MU — Maintenance Unit
 RATG — Rhodesian Air Training Group

See also
 List of British Commonwealth Air Training Plan facilities in Australia
 List of British Commonwealth Air Training Plan facilities in Canada
 List of British Commonwealth Air Training Plan facilities in South Africa
 Aircrew brevet
 Ernest Lucas Guest
 Charles Warburton Meredith

References

 
Rhodesian Air Force
Military history of Southern Rhodesia during World War II
Rhodesia–United Kingdom relations